Rudovci is a suburban settlement of Belgrade, the capital of Serbia. It is situated in the Lazarevac municipality. The population of the settlement is 1,620 people (2011 census).

References

Suburbs of Belgrade
Šumadija
Lazarevac